Lizardo Rodríguez Nue (born 30 August 1910, date of death unknown) was a Peruvian footballer who played for Peru at the 1930 FIFA World Cup. He also played for Sport Progreso.

References

External links
FIFA profile

1910 births
Year of death missing
Peruvian footballers
Peru international footballers
1930 FIFA World Cup players
Association football forwards